Swan 60 is an  sailboat class designed by Germán Frers and built by Nautor's Swan.

Events

World Championships

References

Keelboats
Sailing yachts
2000s sailboat type designs
Sailboat types built by Nautor Swan
Sailboat type designs by Germán Frers
Classes of World Sailing